"Flight into Danger" is a 1966 Australian TV play. It was based on a 1956 Canadian TV play by Arthur Hailey which had been filmed as the movie Zero Hour!.

Australian TV drama was relatively rare at the time.

Plot
On a plane flight, passenger George Spencer is forced to take controls when the crew fall ill with food poisoning.

Cast
Ray Taylor as George Spencer
John Godfrey
Betty Bobbitt
Wyn Roberts
Frank Rich
Keith Eden

Production
The production starred TV personality Ray Taylor in his second television drama role; the first had been Ashes to Ashes also for director Partick Barton. Co star Betty Bobbitt was best known for appearing on Daly at Night. Barton said "Ray is extremely good in this role and manages to portray the anxiety the average man would feel on when called to land a large passenger plane."

Reception
The Age called it "another local production that couldn't quite disentangle itself from technical shortcomings to get off the ground."

References

1966 television plays
1966 Australian television episodes
1960s Australian television plays
Wednesday Theatre (season 2) episodes